The Next Dimension is the first live album and live video by Praga Khan. It was recorded March 4 & 5, 2005 at the Stadsshouwberg in Antwerp and released in 2005. The CD version did not include the track "Kinky World".

Track listing
 "Dreamcatcher" – 3:57	
 "Supersonic Lovetoy" – 4:36	
 "Love and Hate" – 5:49	
 "What's Wrong with Me" – 4:14	
 "Your Lying Eyes" – 5:52	
 "Breakfast in Vegas" – 3:07	
 "The Moon" – 4:16	
 "Lady Alcohol" – 5:10	
 "Kinky World"
 "Time" – 4:08	
 "Mistress of Dreams" – 5:03	
 "Meditation" – 5:30	
 "Guilt" – 4:03	
 "City of a 1000 Sins" – 6:46	
 "The Test of Life" – 4:22	
 "Visions & Imaginations" – 4:24	
 "The Power of the Flower" – 5:37

References

2005 live albums